Naci Özkaya (1922 – 6 March 2007) was a Turkish footballer who played at right back. He competed in the men's tournament at the 1948 Summer Olympics.

References

External links
 

1922 births
2007 deaths
Turkish footballers
Turkey international footballers
Olympic footballers of Turkey
Footballers at the 1948 Summer Olympics
Sportspeople from Trabzon
Association football defenders